Jiří Sosna (born 19 January 1960) is a Czech former judoka. He competed at the 1988 Summer Olympics and the 1992 Summer Olympics.

References

External links
 

1960 births
Living people
Czech male judoka
Olympic judoka of Czechoslovakia
Judoka at the 1988 Summer Olympics
Judoka at the 1992 Summer Olympics
People from Vimperk
Competitors at the 1986 Goodwill Games
Sportspeople from the South Bohemian Region